Skinner Tavern, also known as Skinner's Inn, Halfway Hotel, Western Inn, and Geyer Hotel, is a historic inn and tavern located at Letterkenny Township in Franklin County, Pennsylvania. The original section was built between 1788 and 1792, and is a 2 1/2-story, three bay, stone building in the Georgian-style with a five bay 2 1/2-story, brick addition built between 1837 and 1850. The sections are unified by a gable roof.  The building measures 70 feet, 6 inches, deep and 27 feet, 6 inches, wide.  It housed a general store and post office from 1888 to 1909, when it was converted to a private residence.

In 1788, John Skinner, Sr. was awarded the contract to build the Three Mountain Road from the area now called Upper Strasburg to Burnt Cabins, completing the road about 1790. 
The original stone tavern was built by John Skinner, Sr., likely in 1788. A little later he built a second tavern, also called  Skinners, immediately to the south.  By 1794 he had deeded the original tavern to his son George and deeded the second tavern to John, Jr.

Sometime after October 21, 1794, President George Washington stayed at or travelled past "Skinners", while returning from Bedford to Philadelphia during the Whiskey Rebellion. As he wrote to Alexander Hamilton from Wright's Ferry on October 26, ""thus far I have proceeded without accident to man, horse or Carriage, altho' the latter has had wherewith to try its goodness; especially in ascending the North Mountain from Skinners by a wrong road."

Before 1800, the Three Mountain Road became an important part of the main road from Philadelphia to Pittsburgh, and thus an important path for travelers and settlers going west, and farmers bringing their produce east.  During the "drover's era", which lasted until about 1850, large numbers of cattle and sheep moved east along the road and taverns were located about a mile apart on it.

It was listed on the National Register of Historic Places in 2005.

References

Additional Reading 
 Foreman, Harry E. (1971). Conodoguinet Secrets – A History of Horse Valley, The Kerr Printing Co. (1971), ASIN: B01EBGPMP6

Hotel buildings on the National Register of Historic Places in Pennsylvania
Georgian architecture in Pennsylvania
Buildings and structures in Franklin County, Pennsylvania
National Register of Historic Places in Franklin County, Pennsylvania
1788 establishments in Pennsylvania